The Nevada Lynx were a professional indoor football team that played in 2012 for the American Indoor Football League.  They competed in only four games during their brief existence.  Their inaugural game was on March 6, 2012, on the road against the Arizona Outlaws, but lost 40–13.  One game was supposed to be played by the North Alameda Knights, but the Lynx stepped in.  Then they competed in two early-season matchups against Arizona and Ontario, but then was shutout 92-0 and fell 66-6 later in the season.

References

American Indoor Football League